The 2022 HPP Open was a professional tennis tournament played on hard courts. It was the third edition of the tournament which was part of the 2022 ATP Challenger Tour. It took place in Helsinki, Finland between 14 and 20 November 2022.

Singles main-draw entrants

Seeds

 1 Rankings are as of 7 November 2022.

Other entrants
The following players received wildcards into the singles main draw:
  Aleksi Löfman
  Leevi Säätelä
  Otto Virtanen

The following players received entry into the singles main draw as alternates:
  Adrian Andreev
  Altuğ Çelikbilek
  Jay Clarke
  Dimitar Kuzmanov

The following players received entry from the qualifying draw:
  Alibek Kachmazov
  Oleksii Krutykh
  Mikhail Kukushkin
  Giovanni Mpetshi Perricard
  Leandro Riedi
  Stefano Travaglia

The following player received entry as a lucky loser:
  Evgeny Karlovskiy

Champions

Singles

 Leandro Riedi def.  Tomáš Macháč 6–3, 6–1.

Doubles

 Purav Raja /  Divij Sharan def.  Reese Stalder /  Petros Tsitsipas 6–7(5–7), 6–3, [10–8].

References

2022 ATP Challenger Tour
2022 in Finnish sport
November 2022 sports events in Finland